Richard "Richie" Williams (born 31 May 1986) is an Indigenous Australian former professional rugby league footballer.

Background
Williams was born in Moruya, New South Wales, Australia.

Playing career and controversies
In 2007, Williams was charged with assault, after an incident in the town of Narooma, New South Wales

Also in 2007, Williams created controversy after publicly sledging rival Sydney Roosters player Braith Anasta prior to a game between their respective clubs; a game in which both Williams and his club were considerably dominated by Anasta and the Roosters respectively. Williams was demoted to the premier league by coach Nathan Brown soon afterwards Williams was also involved in an altercation with controversial Bulldogs player Willie Mason over the issue.

Although Williams returned to first-grade with the Dragons, he was eventually released mid-season and signed a contract with the Panthers for the remainder of the year and 2008.

In May 2008,  Williams was sacked from the Penrith Panthers following an incident, the details of which were never released.

Williams also played club rugby union in Sydney and made the Australian Sevens side.

Williams last played for the Burleigh Bears in the Queensland Cup.

References

External links
 Richie Williams Penrith Panther profile

1986 births
Living people
Australian rugby league players
Australian rugby union players
Indigenous Australian rugby league players
St. George Illawarra Dragons players
Penrith Panthers players
Burleigh Bears players
Windsor Wolves players
Rugby league five-eighths
Rugby league fullbacks
Rugby league players from New South Wales